Jorge Manuel Lopes da Silva (born 23 June 1959 in Lisbon) is a Portuguese retired footballer who played as a striker.

External links

1959 births
Living people
Footballers from Lisbon
Portuguese footballers
Association football forwards
Primeira Liga players
Liga Portugal 2 players
S.L. Benfica footballers
Amora F.C. players
Boavista F.C. players
G.D. Chaves players
C.S. Marítimo players
C.F. Os Belenenses players
Vitória F.C. players
A.D. Ovarense players
Portugal youth international footballers
Portugal under-21 international footballers
Portugal international footballers